Trigonotis is a genus of flowering plants belonging to the family Boraginaceae.

Its native range is Southern European Russia to Asia.

Species:
 Trigonotis abata I.M.Johnst. 
 Trigonotis apoensis Elmer

References

Boraginaceae
Boraginaceae genera